A tiger cruise is an American naval voyage that allows civilians to accompany a sea-going Navy vessel. The voyage allows friends and family of deployed sailors and Marines to spend time aboard a sea-going vessel to learn about the ship's day-to-day operations. Civilians are sponsored by a Navy sailor or marine, who accompanies them on the cruise.

References

United States Navy traditions